Roland Bruce Harvey (11 December 1945) is an Australian children's illustrator, and author. He is best known as an illustrator of children's books using pen, ink and watercolour.

His works have been described as 'witty slapstick style' and 'characteristic humorous and detailed illustrations'.

A former architect, Harvey established Roland Harvey Studios, an illustration and design firm in 1978, which produces greeting cards, posters and stationery with a distinctive Australian flavour.

In 1981 he expanded his business by establishing his own book publishing company Five Mile Press. His children's book division, Roland Harvey Books, aims to publish books that raise awareness of issues, concepts and ideas as well as entertain readers. Harvey has written picture books and humorous historical works for young children.

Roland Harvey was born in Melbourne, Victoria and continues to live there.

List of works

Children's stories
 Eureka Stockade (1981) Author: Alan Boardman
 The First Fleet (1982) Author: Alan Boardman
 The Friends of Emily Culpepper (1983) Author: Ann Coleridge
 Burke and Wills (1985) Author: David Greagg
 My Place in Space (1988) with Joe Levine. Authors: Robin and Sally Hirst
 Milly Fitzwilly's Mousecatcher (1991)  Author: Marcia Vaughan
 Islands in My Garden (1998) Author: Jim Howes
 Sick As - Bloody Moments in the History of Medicine (2000)
 At the Beach: Postcards from Crabby Spit (2004)
 In the Bush : Our Holiday at Wombat Flat (2005)
 In the City : Our Scrapbook of Souvenirs (2007)
 Belvedere Dreaming (2002) Author: Kate Ryan
 Belvedere in the City (2002) Author: Kate Ryan
 Belvedere Is Beached (2002) Author: Kate Ryan
 Climbing Mount Sugarbin: Aussie Bites (2003)
 Islands in my Garden (2002)
 The Secret Record of Me (2007)
 Roland Harvey's Big Book of Christmas (2008)
 Saving Mr Pinto (2008) Author: Alison Lester
 The Shadow Brumby (2007) Author: Alison Lester
 Circus Pony (2007) Author: Alison Lester
 Racing the Tide (2007) Author: Alison Lester

Awards
My Place in Space, named an Honour Book in the Children's Book Council of Australia Book of the Year Awards, and The Friends of Emily Culpepper, commended in the same awards. Burke and Wills, part of Harvey's unique Australian history series, won the Clifton Pugh Award for illustration, and Islands in My Garden won the 1999 Wilderness Society Environment Award. One recent book, Sick As: Bloody Moments in the History of Medicine, was shortlisted for the 2001 Children's Book Council of Australia Eve Pownall Award for Information Books.
2005 Dromkeen Medal.

References

External links
 Roland Harvey's website
Allen & Unwin

1945 births
Australian illustrators
Australian children's writers
Writers from Victoria (Australia)
Living people